Loughanstown is a place name and may refer to:

Places
Ireland

Loughanstown, Caheravally, a townland in the barony of Clanwilliam, County Limerick
Loughanstown, Delvin, a townland in the civil parish of Delvin, barony of Delvin, County Westmeath
Loughanstown, Fedamore, a townland in the barony of Clanwilliam, County Limerick
Loughanstown, Portnashangan, a townland in the barony of Corkaree, County Westmeath
Loughanstown, Rathfeigh, a townland in the barony of Skreen, County Meath
Loughanstown, Rathgarve, a townland in the civil parish of Rathgarve, barony of Fore, County Westmeath
Loughanstown, Russagh, a townland in the civil parish of Russagh, barony of Moygoish, County Westmeath
Loughanstown Lower (or Slievelahan), a townland in the civil parish of Russagh, barony of Moygoish, County Westmeath

See also
Loughlinstown